Newport was a parliamentary borough located in Newport (Isle of Wight), which was abolished in for the 1885 general election. It was occasionally referred to by the alternative name of Medina.

(Prior to the Great Reform Act of 1832 there was also a separate Newport parliamentary borough in Cornwall.)

History

The borough was first represented in the parliament of 1295, and returned two members of parliament (MPs) from 1584 to 1868. At the 1868 election the Second Reform Act reduced its representation to a single seat, and under the Redistribution of Seats Act 1885 the constituency was abolished altogether with effect from the 1885 general election. Newport's re-enfranchisement in 1584, like that of the other Isle of Wight boroughs (Newtown and Yarmouth) seems to have been at the urging of the new Governor of the island, Sir George Carey, a relative of the Queen. In token of thanks, the borough granted him for life the right to nominate one of the two MPs – which seems to have been the reward he expected and the motive for his petition to the Queen in the first place.

Between 1807 and 1811 its two seats were held by two future Prime Ministers: Arthur Wellesley, later to become the Duke of Wellington (who also found himself elected to two other seats at the same time), and Henry Temple (later Lord Palmerston), who would go on to become one of the United Kingdom's most notable Prime Ministers. Palmerston's late father had been unable to convert his Irish title into a United Kingdom peerage, therefore the young politician was able to enter the Commons. The local patron arranging the deal was Sir Leonard Holmes, who made it a condition that they never visited the borough!

The borough was also represented by two other future Prime Ministers in the 1820s. George Canning was MP for Newport when appointed Prime Minister in 1827; however, under the law as it then stood a minister accepting office automatically vacated his seat and had to stand for re-election to the Commons, and Canning chose to stand at Seaford, a government pocket borough in Sussex, rather than fight Newport again. In the by-election that followed at Newport, the vacancy was filled by the election of the Honourable William Lamb, later 2nd Viscount Melbourne, whose father had also represented the borough in the 1790s. However, Lamb remained MP for Newport for only two weeks before also being elected for Bletchingley, which he preferred to represent.

Before the Great Reform Act of 1832, the right to vote was vested in the Mayor and Corporation (consisting of 11 aldermen and 12 burgesses). For much of the previous century the borough was "managed" for the government by the Holmes family, meaning that ministers could generally secure the election of their favoured candidates, but often only at the expense of considerable "gratuities" to the voters – in 1754, this apparently amounted to a payment of £600 for each candidate. The borough consisted of the parish of Newport and of Castle Hold in the parish of St Nicholas, thereby excluding that part of the town which extended over the boundary into Carisbrooke parish; this gave the borough a population of 4,398 in 1831. The 1832 reforms extended the borough to take in the rest of the town, raising the population to 6,700, though the electorate was still only 421.

Newport's representation was reduced from two members to one by the second Reform Act for the 1868 general election, and abolished altogether in 1885, leaving the town represented as part of the Isle of Wight county constituency.

Members of Parliament

MPs 1584–1660

MPs 1660–1868

MPs 1868–1885

Election results

Elections in the 1830s

 

Ord was appointed as a Lord Commissioner of the Treasury, requiring a by-election.

Elections in the 1840s

Elections in the 1850s

  
 

Biggs resigned, causing a by-election.

Elections in the 1860s

 

Seat reduced to one member

Elections in the 1870s
Martin's death caused a by-election.

Elections in the 1880s

See also
Isle of Wight
Newtown
Politics of the Isle of Wight
Parliamentary representation from Isle of Wight

Notes and references

Robert Beatson, A Chronological Register of Both Houses of Parliament (London: Longman, Hurst, Res & Orme, 1807) 
D Brunton & D H Pennington, "Members of the Long Parliament" (London: George Allen & Unwin, 1954)
Michael Brock, The Great Reform Act (London: Hutchinson, 1973)
F W S Craig, British Parliamentary Election Results 1832–1885 (2nd Ed) (Aldershot: Parliamentary Research Services, 1989)
D Englefield, J Seaton & I White, Facts About the British Prime Ministers (London: Mansell, 1995)
J E Neale, The Elizabethan House of Commons (London: Jonathan Cape, 1949)
J Holladay Philbin, Parliamentary Representation 1832 – England and Wales (New Haven: Yale University Press, 1965)
Henry Stooks Smith, "The Parliaments of England from 1715 to 1847" (2nd edition, edited by FWS Craig – Chichester: Parliamentary Reference Publications, 1973)
 Robert Walcott, English Politics in the Early Eighteenth Century (Oxford: Oxford University Press, 1956)
Frederic A Youngs, Jr, Guide to the Local Administrative Units of England, Volume I (London: Offices of the Royal Historical Society, 1979)

Parliamentary constituencies in South East England (historic)
Constituencies of the Parliament of the United Kingdom established in 1295
Constituencies of the Parliament of the United Kingdom established in 1584
Constituencies of the Parliament of the United Kingdom disestablished in 1885
Politics of the Isle of Wight
Newport, Isle of Wight